Saugus may refer to:

Places
 Saugus, Massachusetts, U.S.
 Saugus, Santa Clarita, California, U.S., named after its sister city in Massachusetts
 Saugus, Montana, U.S.
 Saugus River, in Massachusetts, U.S.

Education
 Saugus High School (California), U.S.
 2019 Saugus High School shooting
 Saugus Middle-High School, Massachusetts, U.S.
 Saugus Public Schools, Massachusetts, U.S.
 Saugus Union School District, California, U.S.

Other uses
 , the name of several ships

See also

 Saugus Advertiser, newspaper covering the town of Saugus, Massachusetts, U.S.
 Saugus Iron Works National Historic Site, Massachusetts, U.S.
 Saugus Speedway, racetrack in Saugus, Santa Clarita, California, U.S.
 Saugus Town Hall, in Saugus, Massachusetts, U.S.
 Saugus train wreck, in Montana, 1938